To Those Who Walk Behind Us is the eighth album by Danish death metal band Illdisposed.

Track listing 
  "Blood on Your Parade" - 4:18
  "For the Record" - 3:14
  "Come and Get Me" - 4:10
  "Seeking Truth - Telling Lies" - 3:44
  "Sale at the Misery Factory" - 4:31
  "To Those Who Walk Behind Me" - 4:05
  "If All the World" - 4:22
  "My Number Is Expired" - 3:45
  "Johnny" - 4:15
  "This Unscheduled Moment" - 3:43
  "Nu Gik Det Lige Sa Godt" - 3:58
  "When You Scream" (remix, limited edition bonus)
  "Throw Your Bolts" (live, limited  edition bonus)

All lyrics written by Bo Summer, all music written by Jakob "Batten" Hansen.

Personnel 
 Bo Summer - vocals
 Jakob "Batten" Hansen - guitar
 Jonas "Kloge" Mikkelsen - bass
 Thomas "Muskelbux" Jensen - drums

Bass on this record was recorded by Jakob Batten; Franz Gottschalk did not record any guitars on the record, but Batten did.

References 

Illdisposed albums
2009 albums
Massacre Records albums